Zefyria is a village in the inner part of the island of Milos. It had been the chief-town of the island before this title was moved to Plaka. It belongs to the community of Tripiti of the municipality of Milos. Its population according to the 2011 census was 176 inhabitants. It is a mostly agricultural settlement.

References 

Villages in Greece
Populated places in Milos (regional unit)